In the mythology of Fiji, Gedi (Ngendi) is a fertility god who taught humanity the use of fire

References 

Fijian deities
Fertility gods
Fire gods